The 1981 Avon Championships of Houston  was a women's tennis tournament played on indoor carpet courts at the Summit in Houston, Texas in the United States that was part of the 1981 Avon Championships Circuit. It was the 11th edition of the tournament and was held from February 16 through February 22, 1981. Second-seeded Hana Mandlíková won the singles title and earned $22,000 first-prize money. First-seeded Tracy Austin withdrew due to a back injury.

Finals

Singles

 Hana Mandlíková defeated  Bettina Bunge 6–4, 6–4
 It was Mandlíková's 1st title of the year and the 14th of her career.

Doubles
 Sue Barker /  Ann Kiyomura defeated  Regina Maršíková /  Mary Lou Piatek 5–7, 6–4, 6–3

Prize money

References

External links
 International Tennis Federation (ITF) tournament edition details

Avon Championships of Houston
Virginia Slims of Houston
Avon Championships of Houston
Avon Championships of Houston
Avon Championships of Houston
Avon Championships of Houston